Bozhil Naydenov Kolev (born 20 May 1949) is a former Bulgarian football player and manager.

Kolev made 60 appearances for the Bulgarian national team from 1969 to 1978.

Career
Born in Tsonevo, Dalgopol Municipality, Varna Province, Kolev joined Cherno More Varna at the age of ten and progressed through the club's youth system. He made his professional debut on 13 August 1967, scoring a goal in a 3–2 home loss against CSKA Sofia at Yuri Gagarin Stadium. 

In 1972, after spending over eleven years at Cherno More, Kolev joined CSKA Sofia, where he won four A Group titles and three Bulgarian Cups.

Honours

Club
CSKA Sofia
 A Group (5): 1970–71, 1971–72, 1972–73, 1974–75, 1975–76
 Bulgarian Cup (3): 1972, 1973, 1974

AC Omonia
 Cypriot First Division: 1981–82
 Cypriot Cup: 1981–82

References

External links
Player Profile at National-Football-Teams

1949 births
Bulgarian footballers
Bulgarian football managers
Living people
PFC CSKA Sofia players
1974 FIFA World Cup players
Bulgaria international footballers
PFC Cherno More Varna players
PFC CSKA Sofia managers
PFC Cherno More Varna managers
Bulgarian expatriate football managers
AC Omonia players
Expatriate footballers in Cyprus
AC Omonia managers
Nea Salamis Famagusta FC managers
Expatriate football managers in Cyprus
Bulgarian expatriate sportspeople in Cyprus
First Professional Football League (Bulgaria) players
Cypriot First Division players
Sportspeople from Varna, Bulgaria

Association football defenders